Trachinus pellegrini, the Cape Verde weever, is a fish of the family Trachinidae. The species was named and described by Jean Cadenat in 1937 and the specific name honours the French ichthyologist Jacques Pellegrin (1873–1944), who worked at the Muséum National d'Histoire Naturelle in Paris.

References

Further reading

 Fenner, Robert M. The Conscientious Marine Aquarist. Neptune City, New Jersey, USA: T.F.H. Publications, 2001.
 Helfman, G., B. Collette and D. Facey: The diversity of fishes. Blackwell Science, Malden, Massachusetts, USA, 1997.
 Hoese, D.F. 1986. A M.M. Smith and P.C. Heemstra (eds.) Smiths' sea fishes. Springer-Verlag, Berlin, Germany
 Maugé, L.A. 1986. A J. Daget, J.-P. Gosse and D.F.E. Thys van den Audenaerde (eds.) Check-list of the freshwater fishes of Africa (CLOFFA). ISNB, Brussels; MRAC, Tervuren, Flanders; and ORSTOM, Paris, France, Vol. 2.
 Moyle, P. and J. Cech.: Fishes: An Introduction to Ichthyology, 4th ed., Upper Saddle River, New Jersey, USA: Prentice-Hall. 2000.
 Nelson, J.: Fishes of the World, 3rd ed.. New York, USA: John Wiley and Sons., 1994
 Wheeler, A.: The World Encyclopedia of Fishes, 2nd ed., London: Macdonald., 1985

pellegrini
Fish of the East Atlantic
Fish of West Africa
Fauna of the Canary Islands
Marine fauna of West Africa
Fauna of Cape Verde
Fish described in 1937
Taxa named by Jean Cadenat